Mezzanine is the third studio album by English electronic music group Massive Attack, released on 20 April 1998 by Circa and Virgin Records. For the album, the group began to explore a darker aesthetic, and focused on a more atmospheric style influenced by British post-punk, industrial music, hip hop and dub music.

Mezzanine topped the charts in the United Kingdom, Australia, Ireland, and New Zealand, becoming the group's most commercially successful album to date. It ranked highly on many year-end lists. The album spawned four singles, "Risingson", "Teardrop", "Angel" and "Inertia Creeps", which also variously charted in the United Kingdom.

Background and recording
Mezzanine was conceptualized by lead Massive Attack member Robert Del Naja in 1997, who wanted to focus on exploring a darker audiovisual aesthetic with distinct influences. The production of the album was a stressful process; with tensions arising, it led to disagreements that almost split the group, including discouragement from Andrew Vowles. As a demonstration of the project's sound, Del Naja initially produced instrumental demos sampling songs by British post-punk bands such as Wire and Gang of Four, who had been familiar to him as artists he had enjoyed as a teenager. Grant Marshall supported this direction as he wanted to depart from the "urban soul" of their previous album, Protection, but Vowles was sceptical.

The sessions continued with Vowles and Marshall working on bass and drum loops, while Del Naja continued to produce demos. The album was originally set to be released in December 1997, but was delayed by four months, with Del Naja spending most of the time in the studio "making tracks, tearing them apart,  them up, panicking, then starting again." Before the album's release, the group released "Superpredators", a non-album song extensively sampling Siouxsie and the Banshees' song "Metal Postcard", for the soundtrack to the 1997 film The Jackal; the track was subsequently included on the Japanese version of Mezzanine.

The album marked the later parting of Vowles due to creative conflicts, while reggae artist and Massive Attack collaborator Horace Andy contributed to the album on multiple songs. The album's working title was Damaged Goods, which was the name of Gang of Four's 1978 debut single.

The cover art depicts a black stag beetle on a white background, photographed by Nick Knight at the Natural History Museum in London.

Composition
Mezzanine has been described as a trip hop and electronica album with moods of "dark claustrophobia" and melancholy. Musically, the album is a major departure from the jazzy and laidback sound of the first two albums, Blue Lines and Protection, invoking the dark undercurrents which had previously only been vaguely present in the group's music. The album's textured and deep tone relies heavily on abstract and ambient sounds, heavy emphasis on bass, and influences from alternative rock.

Similar to their previous albums, several songs use one or more samples, which range from artists typically sampled in trip hop such as Isaac Hayes and various drum breaks, to bands like the Cure and the Velvet Underground. In particular, "Inertia Creeps" samples Turkish çiftetelli music which Del Naja recorded after partying in Istanbul, with his recorded tape subsequently becoming the rhythmic base for the song. In 1998, Manfred Mann sued Massive Attack for unauthorised use of a sample of the song "Tribute" from Manfred Mann's Earth Band's eponymous 1972 album, used on "Black Milk". The song has subsequently appeared as "Black Melt" on later releases and at live performances, with the sample removed. Later digital editions of Mezzanine have retained the original song, with Mann being added to the songwriting credits.

Reception

Mezzanine entered the UK Albums Chart at number one, and was certified platinum by the British Phonographic Industry (BPI) on 4 September 1998 and then double platinum on 22 July 2013. However, it failed to share the same success in North America, peaking at number 60 on the Billboard 200 and number 51 on the Canadian Albums Chart.

The album received significant critical acclaim, which praised the collective's new sound. Rolling Stones Barney Hoskyns, although praising the album, pointed to its flaws: "Sometimes rhythm and texture are explored at the expense of memorable tunes, and the absence of the bizarre Tricky [...] only highlights the flat, monotonous rapping of the group's 3-D." Robert Christgau of The Village Voice gave the album a two-star honorable mention rating and selected "Risingson" and "Man Next Door" as highlights.

John Bush of AllMusic also had positive words for the album's song "Inertia Creeps", saying it "could well be the highlight, another feature for just the core threesome. With eerie atmospherics, fuzz-tone guitars, and a wealth of effects, the song could well be the best production from the best team of producers the electronic world had ever seen."

Years after the album was released, it was placed on several best-of lists in the UK and the United States. In 2000, Q magazine placed Mezzanine at number 15 on its list of "The 100 Greatest British Albums Ever". In 2013, it was placed at 215 on NMEs list of "The 500 Greatest Albums of All Time". In 2003, the album was ranked number 412 on Rolling Stone magazine's list of "The 500 Greatest Albums of All Time", and while it was not included in the 2012 update of the list, it reentered the 2020 update ranked at number 383.

By April 2000, the album had sold 2.5 million copies worldwide. As of February 2010, it had sold 560,000 copies in the United States, according to Nielsen SoundScan.

Mezzanine DNA
On the 20th anniversary of Mezzanine release, the record was encoded into synthetic DNA—a first for an album. The project was in collaboration with TurboBeads Labs in Switzerland; the digital audio of the album was stored in the form of genetic information. The audio was then compressed using Opus, coded in DNA molecules—with 920,000 short DNA strands containing all the data—and then poured into 5,000 tiny glass beads.

20th anniversary reissue
The album was remastered and reissued for its 20th anniversary. The two-CD anniversary edition was released on 23 August 2019, and comes with a bonus disc of previously unreleased dub mixes by the Mad Professor, which were originally intended to be released on a Mezzanine remix album. A triple-LP vinyl version was also slated to be released; initially delayed from its proposed release date, the triple-LP version was eventually canceled altogether.

In lieu of the vinyl reissue, the Mad Professor remixes were released as a pink-coloured 12-inch vinyl single entitled Massive Attack v Mad Professor Part II (Mezzanine Remix Tapes '98) on 20 September 2019.

The Mad Professor remixes include "Metal Banshee" (an unreleased dub version of "Superpredators", which was a reworked cover of "Metal Postcard" originally by Siouxsie and the Banshees), and "Wire", a track recorded for the soundtrack to the film Welcome to Sarajevo.

Track listing

Sample credits

 "Risingson" contains a sample of "I Found a Reason" by the Velvet Underground.
 "Exchange" and "(Exchange)" contain samples of "Our Day Will Come" by Isaac Hayes.
 "Man Next Door" contains a sample of "10:15 Saturday Night" by the Cure.

Personnel
Credits adapted from the liner notes of Mezzanine.

Massive Attack
 Robert Del Naja – arrangements, vocals, programming, keyboards, samples
 Grant Marshall – arrangements, vocals, programming, keyboards, samples
 Andrew Vowles – arrangements, programming, keyboards, samples

Additional musicians

 Neil Davidge – arrangements, programming, keyboards, samples
 Horace Andy – vocals
 Elizabeth Fraser – vocals
 Sara Jay Hawley – vocals
 Angelo Bruschini – guitars
 Jon Harris, Bob Locke, Winston Blissett – bass guitars
 Andy Gangadeen – drums
 Dave Jenkins, Michael Timothy – additional keyboards

Technical

 Massive Attack – production
 Neil Davidge – production
 Jan Kybert – Pro Tools
 Lee Shepherd – engineering
 Mark "Spike" Stent – mixing
 Jan Kybert – mixing assistance
 P-Dub – mixing assistance
 Tim Young – editing

Artwork
 Nick Knight – photography
 Tom Hingston – art direction, design
 Robert Del Naja – art direction, design

Charts

Weekly charts

Year-end charts

Certifications and sales

See also
 List of UK Albums Chart number ones of the 1990s
 List of European number-one hits of 1998
 List of number-one albums in Australia during the 1990s

Notes

References

1998 albums
Albums produced by Neil Davidge
Massive Attack albums
Virgin Records albums